Joseph "JoJo" Pedroza Diaz Jr. (born November 23, 1992) is an American professional boxer who held the WBC interim lightweight title from July 2021 to December 2021. He also held the IBF super featherweight title from 2020 to February 2021 and challenged once for the WBC featherweight title in 2018. At regional level, he held the WBC-NABF, and WBO-NABO featherweight titles between 2015 and 2018. As an amateur he competed at the 2012 Olympics as a bantamweight.

Early life and education
Joseph is of Mexican descent. He attended Kranz Intermediate at the age of 12–14. He is left-handed and fights southpaw. As a child he played baseball but took up boxing to learn self-defense. He is coached by his father. He attended South El Monte High School.

Amateur career
Prior to the Olympic Trials, he was the two-time reigning national champion at bantamweight that included a win over Antonio Nieves. Diaz became the first American boxer to qualify for the 2012 Olympics by becoming a quarter-finalist at the 2011 World Championships, where he defeated both 2004 Olympic silver medalist Worapoj Petchkoom of Thailand and former world championship bronze medalist Óscar Valdez of Mexico but lost to Lázaro Álvarez. Díaz was the 2011 U.S. National Champion at featherweight at the U.S. Olympic Training Center in Colorado Springs, Colorado. He fought in the 2010-11 World Series of Boxing

At the 2012 Summer Olympics he beat Pavlo Ishchenko, but ran into Alvarez in his second fight and lost again.

World Series of Boxing record

Professional career

Featherweight 
Diaz made his professional debut in 2012 against Vincent Alfaro, winning by unanimous decision over four rounds and also scored a knockdown in the fourth. On May 9, 2015, Diaz defeated Giovanni Delgado via unanimous decision on the undercard of the Canelo Álvarez vs James Kirkland fight. He stepped up competition against veteran Rene Alvarado in a fight televised on HBO Latino in July 2015 and on December 18, Diaz Jr. defeated Hugo Partida and earned the WBC-NABF featherweight title. He went on to defend the title multiple times, before challenging Gary Russell Jr. for the WBC featherweight title on May 19, 2018, at the MGM National Harbor in Oxon Hill, Maryland. Diaz was unsuccessful, losing a unanimous decision to scores of 117–111, 117–111, 115–113.

Super featherweight 
On January 30, 2020, Diaz defeated IBF super featherweight champion Tevin Farmer by unanimous decision with scores of 115–113, 115–113, and 116–112 to claim his first world title. After the fight, Diaz praised his opponent, saying "Tevin Farmer is a hell of a fighter, guys. I thank him for giving me this opportunity."

Diaz's first defense of his IBF super featherweight title was scheduled for February 13, 2021 against Shavkat Rakhimov. However, he was stripped of the title when he missed weight, weighing 3.6 lbs over the 130 lb limit. As a result, the fight still went ahead, but Diaz was fined $100,000 for missing weight, which represented 20% of his purse. The money was split evenly between Rakhimov and the California State Athletic Commission. They fought to a majority draw, with scores of 115–113 Diaz, 114–114, 114–114.

Lightweight

Diaz vs. Fortuna 
Following his draw with Shavkat Rakhimov, Diaz moved up to the lightweight division which he promised would be his best weight, where he fought Javier Fortuna for the vacant WBC interim lightweight title on July 9, 2021. Diaz was docked a point in the fourth round for hitting behind the head, but nonetheless emerged as the victor via unanimous decision, with scores of 117–110, 116–111 and 115–112.

Diaz vs. Haney 
On October 8, 2021, it was announced that Diaz would be defending his WBC interim lightweight title against its previous owner, undefeated Ryan García, in Los Angeles on November 27. However, on October 15, Mike Coppinger of ESPN revealed that García had suffered a hand injury and that the fight would be postponed. This led to back and forth on social media between Diaz and Devin Haney, the full WBC lightweight champion, culminating in an official announcement on November 3 that Diaz would now be challenging for Haney's full world title on December 4, instead of defending his interim title against García.

Professional boxing record

See also
List of world super-featherweight boxing champions
List of Mexican boxing world champions

References

External links

|-

 

1992 births
Living people
Sportspeople from Los Angeles County, California
Bantamweight boxers
Featherweight boxers
Super-featherweight boxers
Southpaw boxers
Winners of the United States Championship for amateur boxers
Boxers at the 2012 Summer Olympics
Olympic boxers of the United States
Boxers from California
American male boxers
People from Downey, California
American people of Mexican descent